The aerobic gymnastics competition at the 2022 World Games took place in July 2022, in Birmingham in United States, at the University of Alabama Birmingham.
Originally scheduled to take place in July 2021, the Games have been rescheduled for July 2022 as a result of the 2020 Summer Olympics postponement due to the COVID-19 pandemic.

Qualification

Medal table

Events

References

External links
 The World Games 2022
 Fédération Internationale de Gymnastique
 Results book

 
2022 World Games